The following are the national records in athletics in the Cayman Islands maintained by Cayman Island's national athletics federation: Cayman Islands Athletic Association (CIAA).

Outdoor

Key to tables:

ht = hand timing

A = affected by altitude

OT = oversized track (> 200m in circumference)

# = not recognised by IAAF

Men

Women

Indoor

Men

Women

Notes

References

External links
CIAA official website

Caymanian
Records
Athletics